Louis Lester Brower (July 1, 1900 – March 4, 1994) was a Major League Baseball player. Brower was a shortstop for the Detroit Tigers in the 1931 season. He had a .161 batting average, with ten hits in 62 at bats. He played 21 games in his one-year career.

Brower was born in Cleveland, Ohio and died in Tyler, Texas, and was Jewish.

References

External links

Detroit Tigers players
Baseball players from Cleveland
1900 births
1994 deaths
Jewish American baseball players
Jewish Major League Baseball players
Ada Herefords players
Minor league baseball managers
20th-century American Jews
Port Huron Saints players